Quytul may refer to:

Quytul, Ardabil, Iran
Quytul, East Azerbaijan, Iran
Quytul, Azerbaijan